Anne Charlotte McClain (born June 7, 1979) is a Colonel in the U.S. Army, engineer and a NASA astronaut. Her call sign, "Annimal", dates back to her bruising rugby days; she also uses the call sign in her Twitter handle, AstroAnnimal. She was a Flight Engineer for Expedition 58/59 to the International Space Station.

Education
Born and raised in Spokane, Washington, McClain wanted to become an astronaut at a young age.  In 1997, McClain graduated from Gonzaga Preparatory School in Spokane. She did a brief stint at Spokane Community College where she played softball and enrolled in R.O.T.C. at Gonzaga University, waiting on an appointment to the United States Military Academy, West Point, where she earned a bachelor's degree in mechanical engineering and was commissioned as an army officer in 2002. She then attended the University of Bath, where she earned a master's degree in aerospace engineering in 2004, and the University of Bristol, where she earned a master's degree in international relations in 2005. Both master's degrees were completed through a Marshall Scholarship. Her work on unsteady aerodynamics and flow visualization of free-to-roll non-slender delta wings was later published through the American Institute of Aeronautics and Astronautics.

McClain traveled to Africa for eight weeks with Operation Crossroads Africa, working on a construction project in Uganda.

Competitive sports
McClain is an avid rugby player who has played in the Women's Premiership, the top level of the sport in England, and for the United States women's national rugby union team, known as the Women's Eagles. While her U.S. Army commitments thwarted her international career in rugby and prevented her participation in the 2006 Women's Rugby World Cup, she participated at that level for a decade interrupted only by her deployment to Iraq, and credits the sport for her success in becoming an astronaut.

According to an interview published in the NASA Johnson YouTube channel, McClain said that the rugby training was helpful when training with a space suit in a neutral buoyancy pool.

Military career

Following her studies, McClain qualified as a Bell OH-58 Kiowa Warrior helicopter pilot. She was deployed to the 2nd Battalion, 6th Cavalry Regiment at Wheeler Army Airfield, Hawaii. McClain rose through the ranks, starting as an Air Traffic Control Platoon Leader, Aviation Intermediate Maintenance Platoon Leader, to Detachment Commander.

McClain was deployed to the Persian Gulf and flew 800 hours and 216 combat missions during the 15 months deployment as part of Operation Iraqi Freedom.

In 2009, McClain participated in Aviation Captain's Career Course and was then assigned to 1st Battalion, 14th Aviation Regiment at Fort Rucker as the battalion operations officer and OH-58D instructor. In May 2010, she was appointed Commander of C Troop, 1st Battalion, 14th Aviation Regiment, responsible for the Army's initial entry training, instructor pilot training, and maintenance test pilot training in the OH-58D Kiowa Warrior. She completed Command and General Staff College and the C-12 fixed wing multiengine qualification courses in 2011 and 2012.

She also served as a command squadron intelligence officer. McClain graduated from the Naval Test Pilot School in June 2013. In total, McClain has logged over 2,000 hours on various aircraft type including the Kiowa Warrior, the Beechcraft C-12 Huron, the Sikorsky UH-60 Black Hawk, and the Eurocopter UH-72 Lakota.

NASA career

In June 2013, the same month as her graduation as a test pilot, McClain was selected by NASA as part of Astronaut Group 21, becoming the youngest astronaut on the NASA roster. She completed training in July 2015, making her available for future missions. She flew to the International Space Station in December 2018 and returned to Earth in June 2019. On December 9, 2020, McClain was announced as one of NASA's Artemis astronauts.

Expedition 58/59 
For her first spaceflight assignment, McClain was assigned to as flight engineer to ISS Expedition 60/61, scheduled for launch aboard Soyuz MS-13 in June–July 2019, although, in January 2018, NASA astronaut Jeanette Epps was removed from the prime crew of Expedition 56/Expedition 57, resulting in her backup, Serena Aunon-Chancellor taking her place on the flight. Due to this, McClain was moved up to take Aunon-Chancellor's spot on the Expedition 56/57 backup crew, and, in turn, was assigned to the prime crew of Expedition 58/Expedition 59, alongside Russian cosmonaut Oleg Kononenko and Canadian astronaut David Saint-Jacques.

The Expedition 58/59 trio launched aboard Soyuz MS-11 to the International Space Station at 06.32 ET (11.32 GMT) on December 3, 2018, from the Cosmodrome in Baikonur, Kazakhstan.  The launch was originally scheduled for December 20, 2018, but was rescheduled to the earlier date after the failure of Soyuz MS-10 with Expedition 57/58 on October 11, 2018. The crew successfully rendezvoused with the ISS six hours later, spending just over two weeks with the Expedition 57 crew, whose landing had been delayed due to the aborted launch of MS-10.

On March 22, 2019, McClain and Nick Hague performed their first Spacewalk to install the adapter plates while Dextre swaps the batteries between spacewalks. The extravehicular activity (EVA) lasted 6 hours and 39 minutes. They also removed debris from the Unity Module in preparation for the arrival of Cygnus NG-11 in April, stowing tools for the repair of the flex hose rotary coupler, and securing tiebacks on the solar array blanket boxes.

McClain was scheduled to perform a second EVA on March 29, with Christina Koch, which would have been the first all-female spacewalk, but spacesuit sizing issues resulted in this EVA's being reassigned to Hague and Koch. McClain conducted a second spacewalk with Saint-Jacques on April 8.

McClain, Saint-Jacques and Kononenko returned to Earth on board Soyuz MS-11 on June 24, 2019.

Awards
McClain is a recipient of the Bronze Star Medal, the Air Medal with Valor device, two additional Air Medals, two Army Commendation Medals, two Army Achievement Medals, the Iraq Campaign Medal with two service stars, the Global War on Terrorism Service Medal, and three Overseas Service Ribbons.

Personal life
McClain married Summer Worden in 2014 and is step-mother to Worden's son. McClain and Worden divorced in 2019.

On August 23, 2019, The New York Times reported that Worden filed a complaint against McClain through the Federal Trade Commission accusing her of illegally accessing financial information while residing in the International Space Station. This accusation outed McClain as lesbian, making her the third known lesbian astronaut after Sally Ride and Wendy B. Lawrence.

The claims were later found to be false and McClain was cleared. 
On April 7, 2020, Worden was handed a two-count federal indictment on charges of making false statements and is currently awaiting trial.

McClain resides in suburban Houston, Texas.

Gallery

See also

 List of female astronauts
 List of female explorers and travelers
 LGBTQ Astronauts
 Women in science

References

External links

 NASA Astronaut Biography
 Houston We Have a Podcast: 'Fly 'em All' an interview with Anne McClain
 
 Five things you didn't know about  Astronaut Anne McClain NASA Johnson Space Center, November 30, 2018

1979 births
Living people
United States Military Academy alumni
Alumni of the University of Bath
Alumni of the University of Bristol
Helicopter pilots
People from Spokane, Washington
Military personnel from Spokane, Washington
United States Army personnel of the Iraq War
Female United States Army officers
United States Army astronauts
United States Naval Test Pilot School alumni
Marshall Scholars
American women aviators
American rugby union players
Recipients of the Air Medal
Crew members of the International Space Station
Women astronauts
American sportswomen
Women in the Iraq War
Female rugby union players
American test pilots
American female rugby union players
American aviators
Women military aviators
Lesbian military personnel
LGBT people from Washington (state)
American LGBT military personnel
American engineers
American Senior Army Aviators
United States Army colonels
Sportspeople from Spokane, Washington
21st-century American women
Spacewalkers